The "Blog" of "Unnecessary" Quotation Marks is a blog about the misuse of English quotation marks. The blog features photographs of signs, notes and advertisements that misuse quotation marks, usually intended as emphasis. Most photographs are reader submissions, curated and commented on by blog author Bethany Keeley-Jonker, who generally intentionally misinterprets the depicted sign.

History
The blog was started in 2005, and after being featured on Yahoo! became an Internet phenomenon.

In September 2016, nearly a year after the previous post, Keeley-Jonker announced that she would no longer be updating the blog, but in March 2020, making "absolutely no promises about the long term", she began updating it again, suggesting that "people wouldn't mind something silly to look at" during the COVID-19 pandemic.

Influence
The theme of the blog has become an Internet meme.  On occasion, some businesses will correct their signs after being featured on the blog. In May 2008, Blogger removed unnecessary quotation marks from a cancel button on the service's delete page.

Other media
A related book was published by Chronicle Books in July 2010. The book is titled The Book of "Unnecessary" Quotation Marks.

See also
Amphibology
Apostrophe Protection Society
Scare quotes

References

External links

 
 Book Listing
 Collection of Quotes
 Los Angeles Times article
 Atlanta Journal Constitution article
 Washington Herald article
 Salon article

Internet memes
American blogs
Punctuation of English
Internet properties established in 2005
Internet properties disestablished in 2016